Charles Corbett "Corb" Denneny (January 25, 1894 – January 16, 1963) was a Canadian professional ice hockey forward who played professionally from 1912 to 1931, including nine seasons in the National Hockey League (NHL) for the Toronto Arenas, Toronto St. Pats, Hamilton Tigers and Chicago Black Hawks. Corbett also played for the Vancouver Maroons of the Pacific Coast Hockey Association (PCHA) and the Saskatoon Sheiks of Western Canada Hockey League (WCHL, then WHL). He twice won the Stanley Cup (1918, 1922) with the original versions of the NHL's Toronto franchise.

His brother, Cy Denneny also played ice hockey and is a member of the Hockey Hall of Fame.

Personal life
He was born and raised in Cornwall, Ontario. As a child Denneny excelled in lacrosse, signing a pro contract at age 14. In track and field, Denneny tied the 100 yard world record in a meet in Toronto. In the winter, Denneny played hockey and he moved to Toronto to play both sports. After his playing career ended, Denneny returned to Toronto, coaching the Toronto Tecumsehs minor league team. He later joined the YMCA, becoming head masseuse and eventually director of health services. Denneny, who was often listed as 'Dennenay' in newspaper reports eventually adopted the spelling.

Corb Denneny died in Toronto on January 16, 1963, after a long illness.

Playing career
Corbett Denneny first played professional ice hockey for the Cobalt McKinley Mines of the Cobalt Mining Hockey League, playing two seasons from 1912 to 1914. He then joined the Toronto Ontarios of the National Hockey Association (NHA) for their 1914–15 season. He then played for the NHA's Toronto Blueshirts for the 1915–16 part of the 1916–17 seasons, before being traded to the Ottawa Senators where he would play with his brother Cy.

He returned to Toronto for the inaugural 1917–18 NHL season playing for the "Torontos", operated by the Toronto Arena Company. He stayed with the organization as it changed to the "Toronto Arenas" and "Toronto St. Patricks", and was a member of two Stanley Cup winners, in 1918 and 1922.  During a six-week span in the 1920–21 NHL season, Corbett and his brother Cy (who still played for the now-NHL Ottawa Senators), each scored six goals during a game—a feat accomplished by only five other players in the history of the NHL.

After the 1922 Stanley Cup win, Denneny was traded to the Vancouver Maroons of the PCHA and lost the 1923 Stanley Cup against the Ottawa Senators and his brother Cy. Brothers Frank and Georges Boucher also played against each other in that series, marking the first time two different sets of brothers faced each other in an NHL or Big Four championship series. In the 1923–24 season, Denneny returned to NHL with Toronto and was traded to the Hamilton Tigers for whom he played for one season. After that season he was picked up by the WCHL's Saskatoon Sheiks, playing in the final two seasons of that major professional league. After the WCHL folded he played for the Sheiks in the Prairie Hockey League until he was traded back to the NHL, playing for the Toronto St. Patricks in the season they became the Toronto Maple Leafs. He was returned to the Sheiks when the trade was not finalized and finished the season with the Sheiks.

Denneny started the 1927–28 season with a return to the NHL when traded to the Chicago Black Hawks, playing his last games in the NHL before being traded back to the Sheiks mid-season. He would play three more professional seasons with the Minneapolis Millers (American Hockey Association/AHA), Newark Bulldogs (Canadian-American Hockey League) and Chicago Shamrocks (AHA), retiring after the 1930–31 season.

Career statistics

Regular season and playoffs

See also

 List of players with 5 or more goals in an NHL game

References

Notes

Bibliography

External links
 
 

1894 births
1963 deaths
Canadian ice hockey centres
Canadian people of Irish descent
Chicago Blackhawks players
Hamilton Tigers (ice hockey) players
Ice hockey people from Ontario
Newark Bulldogs players
Ottawa Senators (NHA) players
Saskatoon Sheiks players
Sportspeople from Cornwall, Ontario
Stanley Cup champions
Toronto Arenas players
Toronto Blueshirts players
Toronto Maple Leafs players
Toronto St. Pats players
Toronto Shamrocks players
Vancouver Maroons players
Canadian expatriate ice hockey players in the United States